Hummingbird is a studio album by Rick Wakeman and Dave Cousins. The songs are a mixture of jointly-composed originals, reworkings of songs from Strawbs albums and Dave Cousins' solo album Two Weeks Last Summer, together with Wakeman instrumental compositions presented as codas to the Cousins songs.

The album cover is painted by Wakeman's girlfriend, Italian artist Alina Bencini.

Track listing
"The Young Pretender" (Dave Cousins, Rick Wakeman) – 5:50
"Hummingbird" (Cousins, Wakeman) – 3:41
"So Shall Our Love Die" (Cousins) – 3:36
"Steppes" (Wakeman) – 1:23
"October to May" (Cousins) – 3:26
"Ice Maiden" (Wakeman) – 0:42
"Higher Germanie" (Traditional) – 4:35
"Stone Cold is the Woman's Heart" (Cousins) – 4:32
"Crie du Coeur" (Wakeman) – 1:26
"All in Vain" (Cousins, Wakeman) – 3:50
"Can You Believe" (Cousins, Craig Leon, Cassell Webb) – 4:44
"Via Bencini" (Wakeman) – 2:12
"Forever Ocean Blue" (Cousins) – 3:38

Personnel
Rick Wakeman – keyboards
Dave Cousins – vocals, acoustic guitar, dulcimer, banjo
Ric Sanders – violin
Mac McGann – tipple
Chas Cronk – bass guitar
Tony Fernandez – drums

Recording

Hummingbird was recorded at Music Fusion Studios, Wembley.

Stuart Sawney (Recording & Mixing)
Erik Jordan (Mixing)
Roger Wake (Mastering)

Release history

References

Liner notes to CD WMCD 2007 Hummingbird

External links
Hummingbird on Strawbsweb
Wakeman and Cousins on Strawbsweb

2002 albums
Rick Wakeman albums
Dave Cousins albums